Arthur William Kusnyer (born December 19, 1945) is an American former catcher in Major League Baseball who was drafted by the Chicago White Sox in the 37th round of the 1966 amateur draft.  He played for the White Sox (1970), California Angels (1971–1973), Milwaukee Brewers (1976), and Kansas City Royals (1978).

He was somewhat error-prone behind the plate during sporadic playing time at the major league level, committing 20 errors in just 136 games for a .970 fielding percentage.  He also had trouble at the plate, with a lifetime batting average of just .176 with 3 home runs and 21 RBIs in 313 career at bats.

Career highlights include:
one 3-hit game...three singles vs. the Texas Rangers (April 21, 1972)
one 5-RBI game...a two-run triple and a three-run double vs. the Texas Rangers (June 29, 1972)
catching Nolan Ryan's second career No-hitter (July 15, 1973)
one 3-RBI game...a three-run double vs. the Boston Red Sox (July 3, 1976)
a home run against All-Star Frank Tanana of the California Angels (June 26, 1978)

Kusnyer was involved in a nine-player transaction when he was sent along with Steve Barber, Clyde Wright, Ken Berry and cash from the Angels to the Brewers for Ellie Rodríguez, Ollie Brown, Joe Lahoud, Skip Lockwood and Gary Ryerson on October 23, 1973.

After his playing career, he eventually found his way back to the White Sox as the bullpen coach, where he served for 19 years (1980–87, 1997–2007). In between, from 1988 to 1995, he held the same position with the Oakland Athletics. He was a longtime member of Tony La Russa's coaching staffs in both cities. Kusnyer stepped away from coaching full time in 2007 when his failing eyesight became too much of an obstacle. Between August 2007 and April 2008, he underwent eight surgeries to attempt to restore his vision. In 2008-2009, he was listed as a roving minor league instructor by the White Sox.

References
1979 Baseball Register published by The Sporting News

External links

1945 births
Major League Baseball catchers
Major League Baseball bullpen coaches
Chicago White Sox coaches
Chicago White Sox players
California Angels players
Milwaukee Brewers players
Kansas City Royals players
Baseball players from Akron, Ohio
Oakland Athletics coaches
Sacramento Solons players
Omaha Royals players
Spokane Indians players
Lynchburg White Sox players
Iowa Oaks players
Salt Lake City Angels players
Living people
Kent State Golden Flashes baseball players